Elegant lupine is a common name for several plants and may refer to:

Lupinus concinnus, native to the southwestern United States and northern Mexico
Lupinus elegans, native to Mexico and Guatemala